The swallow-tailed kite (Elanoides forficatus) is a pernine raptor which breeds from the southeastern United States to eastern Peru and northern Argentina. It is the only species in the genus Elanoides. Most North and Central American breeders winter in South America where the species is resident year round.

Taxonomy and systematics 

The swallow-tailed kite was first described as the "swallow-tail hawk" and "accipiter cauda furcata" (forked-tail hawk) by the English naturalist Mark Catesby in 1731. It was given the binomial scientific name Falco forficatus by Carl Linnaeus in the 10th edition of Systema Naturae, published in 1758;  he changed this to Falco furcatus in the 12th edition of 1766. The latter spelling was used widely during the 18th and 19th centuries, but the original spelling has precedence. The genus Elanoides was introduced by the French ornithologist Louis Jean Pierre Vieillot in 1818.

Description 
Male and female individuals appear similar. The body is a contrasting deep black and white. The flight feathers, tail, feet, bill are all black. The wings are also relatively elongated, as the wing chord measures .
50 to 68 cm in length, with a wingspan of 1.12–1.36 m with a wing chord measuring 39–45 cm. The body is a contrasting deep black and white. The upper side of the wings is black along with the, tail, feet, and bill. The underside of the wings is partly black and partly white. The forked tail is 27.5–37 centimeters long.

Young swallow-tailed kites are duller in color than the adults, and the tail is not as deeply forked.

Habitat and behavior 

The swallow-tailed kite is largely associated with large tracts of wetland forests which accommodates the birds nesting habits. Loblolly pines are the most prevalent choice for building nests but bald cypress (Taxodium distichum) are also used when the pines are unavailable. The major requirement of these nesting sites are food availability and tree height. Historic ranges in the United States covered the majority of the Southern states and much of the Midwest (as far north as Minnesota). Aside from the US, it resides in many areas throughout Central and South America. Habitat degradation and changes in wetland hydrology have caused the range to shrink in the US to just coastal regions of the southeastern and southwestern US, roughly an 80% decline in population. Swallow-tailed kites are considered migratory raptors and during the spring months often move from areas in Central and South America to breed. Roughly 3% of the worlds population breed in the United States. Traveling thousands of miles these birds move towards the most suitable nesting habitat found within coastal wetlands between the Americas. Land located within migration routes is thought to be another concern for the kites, as deforestation and habitat degradation in Central and South Americas can have adverse affects as the birds move to breed.
The birds are considered one of the most graceful fliers seen in America and often spend the majority of their lives scouring high tree tops for lizards, small mammals, and insects. The morphology of the swallow-tailed kite's wing and tail structure allows the bird to glide effortlessly for long distances.

Sometimes a high-pitched chirp is emitted, though the birds mostly remain silent.

Diet 
The swallow-tailed kite feeds on small reptiles, such as snakes and lizards. It may also feed on small amphibians such as frogs; large insects, such as grasshoppers, crickets, termites, ants, wasps, dragonflies, beetles, and caterpillars; small birds and their eggs and nestlings; and small mammals including bats. It has also been known to prey on fish. It has been observed to regularly consume fruit in Central America. It drinks by skimming the surface and collecting water in its beak.  The bird usually does not break flight during feeding.

Reproduction 
Mating occurs from March to May, with the female laying 2 to 4 eggs. Incubation lasts 28 days, and 36 to 42 days to fledge.  Often thought to form monogamous pairs, the birds are thought to spend some time apart and meet up during migrations to nesting locations. These nesting locations are often found in the highest trees in wetland areas. On occasion, pairs will return to the same nesting locations of the previous years and refurbish old nests. Generally, nests take about four days to complete.

Conservation in the United States 

Swallow-tailed kites are not listed as endangered or threatened by the federal government in the United States. They are listed as endangered by the state of South Carolina and as threatened by the state of Texas. They are listed as "rare" by the state of Georgia.

The Center for Birds of Prey in Charleston, SC has an ongoing effort to track sightings within the state. Anonymous reports can be made at https://stki.thecenterforbirdsofprey.org or by telephone. They will also send you the summary of the years reported sightings if you leave them your contact information.

Destruction of habitats is chiefly responsible for the decline in numbers. A key conservation area is the Lower Suwannee National Wildlife Refuge in Florida.  As of 2016, populations have seemed to stabilize and even show increasing trends.  Successful habitat restoration and management has allowed these birds to reestablish nesting populations in areas of Georgia, Florida, and South Carolina.

References 
Sources
 Stiles and Skutch, A guide to the birds of Costa Rica 

Notes

External links

 
5 pictures of Swallow-tailed Kites at amazilia.net
Stamps (for Grenadines of Guyana, Guyana, Nicaragua) with Range Map at bird-stamps.org
 
Photo of soaring Swallow-tailed Kite at cayaya-birding.com
 
 
 Illustration in Histoire naturelle des oiseaux de l'Amérique Septentrionale (1807).
 Description by Vieillot (1818) of Milan de la Caroline and Milan Yetapa du Paraguay, and the original designation of Elanoïdes (in French).
 Illustration in Lesson's Traite d'Ornithologie (1831).
 https://dc.statelibrary.sc.gov/bitstream/handle/10827/11034/DNR_Species_Swallow-tailed_Kite_2005.pdf?sequence=1

swallow-tailed kite
Birds of Central America
Birds of South America
Birds of the Amazon Basin
Birds of Brazil
Birds of the Guianas
Birds of Nicaragua
Native birds of the Southeastern United States
Birds of prey of South America
swallow-tailed kite
swallow-tailed kite